The Raleigh mayoral election of 2011 was held on October 11, 2011, to elect a Mayor of Raleigh, North Carolina for a two-year term. Incumbent Mayor Charles Meeker announced in April 2011 that he would not run for a sixth term. 
The election was officially a non-partisan contest, but outgoing Mayor Meeker was well known as a Democrat. Meeker endorsed candidate Nancy McFarlane, who is politically unaffiliated, to succeed him. She won the election with 61 percent of the vote, making a runoff unnecessary.

Candidates
Filed
Nancy McFarlane, member of City Council and pharmacist
Billie Redmond, real estate executive
Randall Williams, obstetrician/gynecologist

Declined
J. B. Buxton, former deputy state school superintendent
Seth Keel, 17-year-old high school senior

Results

Footnotes

External links
Wake County Board of Elections

2011
Raleigh
Raleigh mayoral